Naser Razzazi (born June 21, 1955) is a Kurdish singer, poet and writer. His music encompasses traditional Kurdish folk songs in four different Kurdish dialects, Soranî, Kurmanji, Hewramî (Zhawaroee) and Kalhori (Southern Kurdish).

Naser Razzazi, sometimes written Nasr or Naser Rezzazi or Rezazî was born to a poor family in Iranian Kurdistan, but has lived most of his life exiled in the Kurdish diaspora, mainly Sweden. After Saddam Hussein's fall, he returned to live in Iraqi Kurdistan. 

In addition to singing, and since his early days as a school teacher, Rezazi has contributed greatly to Kurdish literature and art through his music and poetry that combines different Kurdish genres, dialects and musical styles.

Personal life
Nasser was married to an artist of her own right, Merziye Feriqi, until her death in 2005. He has since remarried.

He fought as a peshmerga-soldier in Iranian Kurdistan, under the political Kurdish political party Komalah for the struggle of an independent Kurdistan.
During his period as a guerrilla soldier, fighting for the Kurdish cause, his first audience was namely the peshmerga.

Discography

(selective)
1976: Kurdistan (کوردستان)
1976: Katana 
1979: Dêwane Xom (دێوانە خۆم)
1982: Gomeşîn (گۆمەشین)
1984: Le Gulan (لە گوڵان)
1988: Helebce (ھەڵەبجە)
1993: Rezyane (ڕەزیانە)
1994: Nyaz (نیاز)
1995: Be Pîroz (بە پیرۆز)
1995: Hîwa (هیوا)
1996: Xemî Nan (خەمی نان)
2000: Kirmaşan (کرماشان)
2010: Êwareye (ئێوارەیە)
2012: Bîrewerî (بیره‌وه‌ری)
2016: Gulbaran (گوڵباران)
2019: Şarekem (شارەکەم)

References

External links
 Lyrics to Nasir Rezazî's music and songs can be found at the Kurdish Lyrics archive Bêjebêje.
 

Kurdish male singers
People from Sanandaj
People convicted of blasphemy
1955 births
Living people
Komala Party of Iranian Kurdistan politicians